Operational calculus, also known as operational analysis, is a technique by which problems in analysis, in particular differential equations, are transformed into algebraic problems, usually the problem of solving a polynomial equation.

History

The idea of representing the processes of calculus, differentiation and integration, as operators 
has a long history that goes back to Gottfried Wilhelm Leibniz. The mathematician Louis François Antoine Arbogast was one of the first to manipulate these symbols independently of the function to which they were applied.
 
This approach was further developed by Francois-Joseph Servois who developed convenient notations. Servois was followed by a school of British and Irish mathematicians including  Charles James Hargreave, George Boole, Bownin, Carmichael, Doukin, Graves, Murphy, William Spottiswoode and Sylvester.

Treatises describing the application of operator methods to ordinary and partial differential equations  were written by Robert Bell Carmichael in 1855 and by Boole in 1859.

This technique was fully developed by the physicist Oliver Heaviside in 1893, in connection with his work in telegraphy. 
Guided greatly by intuition and his wealth of knowledge on the physics behind his circuit studies,  [Heaviside] developed the operational calculus now ascribed to his name.
At the time, Heaviside's methods were not rigorous, and his work was not further developed by mathematicians. 
Operational calculus first found applications in electrical engineering problems, for 
the calculation of transients in linear circuits after 1910, under the impulse of Ernst Julius Berg, John Renshaw Carson and Vannevar Bush.

A rigorous mathematical justification of Heaviside's operational methods came only  
after the work of Bromwich that related operational calculus with 
Laplace transformation methods (see the books by Jeffreys, by Carslaw or by MacLachlan for a detailed exposition). 
Other ways of justifying the operational methods of Heaviside were introduced in the mid-1920s using 
integral equation techniques (as done by Carson) or Fourier transformation (as done by Norbert Wiener).

A different approach to operational calculus was developed in the 1930s by Polish mathematician 
Jan Mikusiński, using algebraic reasoning.

Norbert Wiener laid the foundations for operator theory in his review of the existential status of the operational calculus in 1926:
The brilliant work of Heaviside is purely heuristic, devoid of even the pretense to mathematical rigor. Its operators apply to electric voltages and currents, which may be discontinuous and certainly need not be analytic. For example, the favorite corpus vile on which he tries out his operators is a function which vanishes to the left of the origin and is 1 to the right. This excludes any direct application of the methods of Pincherle…
Although Heaviside’s developments have not been justified by the present state of the purely mathematical theory of operators, there is a great deal of what we may call experimental evidence of their validity, and they are very valuable to the electrical engineers. There are cases, however, where they lead to ambiguous or contradictory results.

Principle
The key element of the operational calculus is to consider differentiation as an operator p =  acting on functions. Linear differential equations can then be recast in the form of "functions"  of the operator  p  acting on the unknown function equaling the known function. Here,  is defining something that takes in an operator  p  and returns another operator . 
Solutions are then obtained by making the inverse operator of  act on the known function. The operational calculus generally is typified by two symbols, the operator  p,  and the unit function 1. The operator in its use probably is more mathematical than physical, the unit function more physical than mathematical. The operator  p  in the Heaviside calculus initially is to represent the time differentiator . Further, it is desired this operator bear the reciprocal relation such that  p  denotes the operation of integration.

In electrical circuit theory, one is trying to determine the response of an electrical circuit to an impulse. Due to linearity, it is enough to consider a unit step:
 Heaviside step function:   such that H(t) = 0 if t < 0  and  H(t) = 1 if t > 0.

The simplest example of application of the operational calculus is to solve: , which gives

.

From this example, one sees that  represents integration. Furthermore   iterated integrations is represented by  so that 

Continuing to treat  p  as if it were a variable,
 
which can be rewritten by using a geometric series expansion, 

 
Moreover, if the function 1/F(p) has a series expansion of the form

it is straightforward to find

Applying this rule, solving any linear differential equation is  reduced to a purely algebraic problem.

Heaviside went further, and defined fractional power of p, thus establishing a connection between operational calculus and fractional calculus.  
 
Using the Taylor expansion, one can also verify the Lagrange-Boole translation formula, so the operational
calculus is also applicable to finite difference equations and to electrical engineering problems with delayed signals.

References

 Terquem and Gerono (1855) Nouvelles Annales de Mathematiques: journal des candidats aux écoles polytechnique et normale 14, 83 [Some historical references on the precursor work till Carmichael].
 O. Heaviside (1892) Electrical Papers, London
 O. Heaviside (1893, 1899, 1902) Electromagnetic Theory, London
 O. Heaviside (1893)  Proc. Roy. Soc. (London) 52: 504-529, 54: 105-143 (1894)
 J. R. Carson (1926) Bull. Amer. Math. Soc. 32, 43.
 J. R. Carson (1926) Electric Circuit Theory and the Operational Calculus,  (McGraw Hill).
 H. Jeffreys (1927) Operational Methods In Mathematical Physics Cambridge University Press, also at   Internet Archive
 H. W. March (1927) Bull. Amer. Math. Soc. 33, 311, 33, 492 .
 Ernst Berg (1929) Heaviside's Operational Calculus, McGraw Hill via Internet Archive
 Vannevar Bush (1929) Operational Circuit Analysis with an appendix by Norbert Wiener, John Wiley & Sons
 H. T. Davis (1936)  The Theory of Linear Operators (Principia Press, Bloomington).
 N. W. Mc Lachlan (1941)  Modern Operational Calculus (Macmillan).
 H. S. Carslaw (1941) Operational Methods in Applied Mathematics Oxford University Press.
 Balthasar van der Pol & H. Bremmer (1950) Operational calculus Cambridge University Press
 B. van der Pol (1950) "Heaviside's Operational Calculus" in Heaviside Centenary Volume by the Institute of Electrical Engineers 
 R. V. Churchill (1958) Operational Mathematics McGraw-Hill
 J. Mikusinski (1960) Operational Calculus Elsevier
  A. Erdelyi (1962) "Operational Calculus and Generalized Functions" (Dover Reprint Edition  2013)  

 Jesper Lützen (1979) "Heaviside's operational calculus and attempts to rigorize it", Archive for History of Exact Sciences 21(2): 161–200 
 Paul J. Nahin (1985) Oliver Heaviside, Fractional Operators, and the Age of the Earth, IEEE Transactions on Education E-28(2): 94–104, link from IEEE Explore.
 James B. Calvert (2002) Heaviside, Laplace, and the Inversion Integral, from University of Denver.

External links
IV Lindell HEAVISIDE OPERATIONAL RULES APPLICABLE TO ELECTROMAGNETIC PROBLEMS 
Ron Doerfler Heaviside's Calculus
Jack Crenshaw essay showing use of operators More On the Rosetta Stone

Linear operators
Electrical engineering
Differential equations